A+D may refer to:

 Adrian & the Mysterious D
 Architecture and Design Museum, Los Angeles
 A+D Ointment by Bayer

See also
A&D (disambiguation)